Dimitar Mutafchiev (10 January 1903 – 8 September 1990) was a Bulgarian footballer. He was born in Stara Zagora, and played as a forward for Levski Sofia and Bulgaria during the 1920s.

Career 
For nine seasons from 1921 to 1930, Mutafchiev scored 48 goals in 60 games for Levski Sofia.

He played for the national team in the Bulgaria's first international match against Austria in Vienna on 21 May 1924. Mutafchiev also participated at the 1924 Summer Olympics.

Career statistics

Honours 
Player
Levski Sofia

 Bulgarian State Football Championship
 Runners-up (2): 1925, 1929
 Sofia Championship
 Champion (4): 1923, 1924, 1925, 1929
 Ulpia Serdika Cup
 Winner (2): 1926, 1930

Coach
Levski Sofia

 Bulgarian league
 Champion (1): 1953

References

External links 

1903 births
1990 deaths
Bulgarian footballers
Bulgaria international footballers
Footballers at the 1924 Summer Olympics
PFC Levski Sofia players
Sportspeople from Stara Zagora
Bulgarian football managers
PFC Levski Sofia managers
FC Lokomotiv 1929 Sofia managers
Association football forwards
Olympic footballers of Bulgaria